Acaja Club is a Guinea-Bissauan football club based in Ancadona. They play in the league amateur Guinean football, the Campeonato Nacional da Guine-Bissau.

Current squad

Acaja Club